The 22nd Legislative Assembly of Quebec was the Quebec, Canada provincial legislature that existed from August 8, 1944, to July 28, 1948. The Union Nationale led by Maurice Duplessis returned to power after defeating the Quebec Liberal Party led by Adélard Godbout who defeated the Union Nationale in the 1939 elections. It was the first of four consecutive terms by the UN until 1960.

Seats per political party

 After the 1944 elections

Member list

This was the list of members of the Legislative Assembly of Quebec that were elected in the 1944 election:

Other elected MLAs

Other MLAs were elected in by-elections during this term

 Georges-Octave Poulin, Union Nationale, Beauce, November 21, 1945 
 Charles Daniel French, Union Nationale, Compton, July 3, 1946 
 Daniel Johnson, Union Nationale, Bagot, December 18, 1946 
 John Gillies Rennie, Union Nationale, Huntingdon, July 23, 1947

Cabinet Ministers

 Prime Minister and Executive Council President: Maurice Duplessis
 Agriculture: Laurent Barrée
 Colonization: Joseph-Damase Begin
 Labour: Antonio Barrette
 Public Works: Roméo Lorrain
 Health and Social Welfare: Albiny Paquette (1944-1946)
 Social Welfare and Youth: Paul Sauvé (1946-1948)
 Health: Albiny Paquette (1947-1948)
 Lands and Forests: John Samuel Bourque
 Hunting and Coastal Fisheries: Camille-Eugène Pouliot  
 Mines: Jonathan Robinson
 Hydraulic resources: John Samuel Bourque (1945-1948)
 Roads: Antonio Talbot
 Municipal Affairs: Bona Dussault
 Industry and Commerce: Jean-Paul Beaulieu
 Attorney General: Maurice Duplessis
 Provincial Secretary: Omer Côté
 Treasurer: Onésime Gagnon
 Members without portfolios: Thomas Chapais, Antonio Élie, Tancrède Labbé, Marc Trudel, Patrice Tardif, Joseph-Hormisdas Delisle, Joseph-Théophile Larochelle

New electoral districts

The electoral map was slightly modified in 1945 as the Charlevoix et Saguenay riding was split into two new ridings: Charlevoix and Saguenay. The change was effective in the 1948 elections.

References
 1944 election results
 List of historical Cabinet Ministers

22